Li Gen may refer to:

 Li Gen (basketball) (born 1988), Chinese professional basketball player
 Li Gen (Investiture of the Gods), yaksha in Chinese novel Investiture of the Gods
 Li Gen (Qing dynasty), Chinese calligrapher in Qing dynasty
 Li Gen (Tang dynasty), Chinese high-level official in Tang dynasty
 Li Gen (footballer) (born 1995), Chinese professional football player